The 2019 FAI Women's Cup Final, known as the 2019 Só Hotels FAI Women's Cup Final for sponsorship reasons, was the final match of the 2019 FAI Women's Cup, the national association football Cup of the Republic of Ireland. The match took place on 3 November 2019 at the Aviva Stadium in Dublin. Peamount United and Wexford Youths contested the match.

The match was shown live on RTÉ2 and RTÉ2 HD in Ireland, and via the RTÉ Player worldwide with commentary from Ger Canning and Lisa Fallon. It was refereed by Sarah Dyas, assisted by Michelle O'Neill and Katie Hall with Emma Cleary as Fourth Official.

Underdogs Wexford Youths won the Cup to retain the trophy they won for a second time in 2018. League champions Peamount United were unable to emulate their only previous Cup win in 2010 and were denied a "double".

Match

Summary
Wexford Youths took the lead after three minutes, when Lauren Kelly dribbled through the Peamount defence and shot low past a surprised Niamh Reid Burke. Karen Duggan scored a long-range equaliser for Peamount on 32 minutes, only for Kelly to reinstate Wexford's lead two minutes later.

Seven minutes into the second half, Eleanor Ryan-Doyle brought the score back to 2–2 with another long range-goal from outside the penalty area. Wexford captain Kylie Murphy scored what proved to be the winning goal on 64 minutes, when she was assisted by Rianna Jarrett and curled a composed shot past Reid Burke from 12 yards (11m).

Details

References

External links
RTÉ's full match coverage on RTÉ Player

FAI Women's Cup finals
November 2019 sports events in Europe